Fex urbis lex orbis is a Latin saying, meaning "Dregs [classical Latin faex] of the city, law of the world", that is, the lowest class of citizens determines how the world works. 

First written by St. Jerome, the phrase is often erroneously attributed to Victor Hugo, who quotes it ironically at the beginning of Volume V of Les Misérables while advising one to be careful in labeling social groups:

Notes

Latin words and phrases
Works by Jerome